Odessa Lake is a lake in the municipalities of Kingston and Loyalist in eastern Ontario, Canada. It is in the Lake Ontario drainage basin.

The settlement of Florida lies just northwest of the lake. The primary inflow, at the northeast, and outflow, at the southwest, is Millhaven Creek, which flows to Lake Ontario.

References

Lakes of Lennox and Addington County
Landforms of Kingston, Ontario